Parliament of Negrete may refer to:

 Parliament of Negrete (1726)
 Parliament of Negrete (1793)